The Tsarap River or the Tsarap Chu forms the eastern part of the Zanskar valley, in the Ladakh union territory of India.

Geography 

The Tsarap River has its source in the glaciers near Pankpo La Pass at the border of Ladakh and Himachal Pradesh. After rising from its source, the Tsarap River flows north-east up to Sarchu, a camping site at the Leh-Manali Highway. Here the Tsarap River joins a confluence of three rivers: of Lingti, Yunan and Sarchu River. At village Purne, the Tsarap River is joined by Kargyag River, which originates near the Shingo La pass. Then the Tsarap River flows down the main Zanskar valley, through the towns of Mone, Tichip, Jamyang Lang, Dorzong and Chia. The river then passes a confluence with its tributary the Stod River at Padum, the capital of Zanskar. Together, these two rivers form the Zanskar River, a tributary of the Indus River.

The Tsarap River contributes to the minimal agricultural production of the Zanskar valley, mainly to the lower areas of Chia, by providing irrigation to the fields of barley, wheat, buckwheat and peas. Accessible in the summer, the Pensi La mountain pass which connects Zanskar with rest of the country, receives heavy snowfall along with the other pass, Zojila, which results in the valley being cut off during winter from rest of the state, with the river freezing during this season. The Tsarap River is famous for adventure sports. Rafting events are organised in the Tsarap, Stod and the Zanskar rivers.

Landslide Dam

The landslide, which occurred on 31 December 2014 between Shun and Phuktal villages, was first noticed when the Alchi Hydroelectric Power Project downriver reported a drop in water level.

The barrier is believed to be  fine-grained, with boulders having a narrow crest. A report submitted by local authorities prohibited the use of explosives to clear the debris, as it would trigger more landslides and aggravate the situation. They called on the National Disaster Management for assessment of the situation. According to the deputy collector of Zanskar, "The lake has been created around 90 km from the Padam area of Zanskar and beyond 43 km no one can go by foot. After consulting all local engineers, including Army engineers, we were not able to do anything". On 20 February 2015 the National Disaster Management after a ground survey submitted a report on which the Committee headed by the Union Cabinet Secretary deployed a team at the site to carry out controlled blasting and manual work to allow channelized flow of water.

The severe temperatures in the region, below -20 °C had frozen the lake and chances of a breach would rise with a  temperature increase in the following days. Authorities  closed down the old trade route, the Chadar Trek, and airlifted the people stranded therein to the safer places. People living downstream  of Tsarap were also warned to move to higher ground. Control rooms were been set up at Padum and Phuktal to keep watch on the situation.

References 

Rivers of Ladakh
Geography of Ladakh
Indus basin
Landslide-dammed lakes
Rivers of India